Tatvas are the 96 qualities or properties of human body according to Akilattirattu Ammanai, the religious book of Ayyavazhi. They are as follows:

Jñānendriya - 5
The organs of sense

The eye - the organ of sight having visible formes as its object.
The ear - the organ of hearing, having sound as its object.
The nose - the organ of smelling, having smell (odors) as its object.
The tongue - the organ of tasting, having flavors as its object.
The skin – the organ of feeling, having touch (contact) as its object.

Karmendriya - 5
The organs of actions

The mouth (the organ of speech)
The feet (the organ to move(walk))
The hands (the organ to grasp(force, work on outer))
The anus (the organ of excretion)
The genitals (the organ of procreation)

Tanmatras - 5
The archetypes or subtle rudiments of elementary matter, the five elements being resolved into the rudimentary elements of the five senses.

The light
The sound
The taste
The smell
The consciousness

Antahkarana - 4
The intellectual powers

Mana – the organ of thought
Buddhi – the organ of understanding.
Aham – the power of mind which leads to the accomplishment of objectives, and eventually toward identifications and attachments.
Chitta – the organ where Sanskaras are stored, and from where all the vikaras of mind originate.

Naadi - 10
The ten nerves:

Suzhi munai – the nerve passing through six ataras
Idakalai – the nerve beginning from the great toe of the right foot and passing up to the left nostril.
Pinkalai -  the nerve beginning from the great toe of the left foot and passing up to the right nostril.
Kanthari – the nerve beginning at the navel and passing to the neck, where it assumes a sevenfold form, being the source of the seven musical tones of the human voice.
Atthi
Siguvai – situated in the region of the eyes forming ten branches, as optical nerves.
Alambudai
Purudan – in the region of the ears forming 120 branches or auditory nerves
Guru – beginning at the naval and reaching to the verenda.
Sangini – situated in the verenda.

Chakras - 7
There are seven Chakras

Moolaadhaara
Swaadhisthaana
Manippoora
Anaahata
Vishuddhi
Aajnaa
Sahasraara

Dhatus - 7
The seven constituents of the body:

The Serum
The Blood
The Semen
The bone marrow
The Flesh
The Bone
The Skin

Vayu - 10
The ten vital airs of the body

Praana – situated in the heart
Apaana - situated in the top of the head and passing downwards
Samaana - situated in the pit of the throat
Vyaana – pervading the whole body
Udaana - situated in the navel
Naaga – which effects the motions and speech
Koorma – causing horripilation
Krikara - seated in the face
Devadatta – that which is exhaled in yawning
Dhananjaya – that which remains in the body after the death and escapes by splitting the head.

Kosa - 5
There are five Kosa

Annamaya - The food body
Pranamaya -  The force vitalizes and holds together the body and the mind
Manomaya - The body composed of mind
Vijnanamaya - The body composed of intellect
Anandamaya - The body composed of bliss

Navadwaram - 9

The apertures to the body

Two eyes
Two ears
Two nostrils
The mouth
The anus
Urinary orifice

Vikaara - 8
(Kaama[desire], Krodha[anger], Lobha[greed], Moha[attachment], Mada[arrogance] and Maatsarya[hatred](Jealousy is also a kind of hatred) are the original Vikaaras mentioned in Gita)

The eight vices

Lust
Penuriousness
Wrath
Fierce, ungovernable lust
Recklessness
Ostentation
Arrogance
Envy

Mandala - 3
The three regions of the human body

Agni mandala – that of fire in lower abdomen
Aaditya mandala – of the sun in the stomach
Chandra mandala – of the moon in the head and shoulders

Pini - 3
The three kinds of temperaments - tri doshas

Vaata - Flatulency – inducing melancholy.
Pitta - Bile – bilious distempers.
Kapha - Phlegm – a phlegmatic temper.

Gunas - 3
The three attributes. (The 3 original Powers causing the creation)

Sattva guna(Jnaana Shakti)
Rajas guna (Kriyaa Shakti)
Tamo guna (power of ignorance and obstruction causing darkness)

Mala - 3
The three evil passions inherent in the soul

Pride
Moral actions
Maya

Avasthaa - 5

These are 5 states of consciousness in human forms.

 Jaagarita - Waking
 Swapna - copping
 Sushupti - Deep Sleep (slumber)
 Tureeya - Underlying state in all the above states
 Unmani or Tureeyateeta - State of enlightened beings where the cosmos is experienced as oneness.

See also
 Kaliyan
 Ayyavazhi

Further reading
 A. Ari Sundara Mani, 2002, Akilathirattu Ammanai Parayan Urai, Ayya Vaikunda Thirukkudumbam.
 N. Vivekanandan, 2003, Akilathirattu Ammanai Moolamum Uraiyum, Vivekananda Pathippakam.

Ayyavazhi philosophical concepts